Apocalyptica is a Finnish cello metal trio, known for their unusual music style and some famous compositions.

Apocalyptica may also refer to: 

Apocalyptica (album) the 2005 album by the group of the same name
 Apocalyptica (video game) is a computer game developed by Extreme FX and published by Konami in 2003

See also
 Apocalyptic (disambiguation)